The 2011 Canarian regional election was held on Sunday, 22 May 2011, to elect the 8th Parliament of the Autonomous Community of the Canary Islands. All 60 seats in the Parliament were up for election. The election was held simultaneously with regional elections in twelve other autonomous communities and local elections all throughout Spain.

Overview

Electoral system
The Parliament of the Canary Islands was the devolved, unicameral legislature of the autonomous community of the Canary Islands, having legislative power in regional matters as defined by the Spanish Constitution and the Canarian Statute of Autonomy, as well as the ability to vote confidence in or withdraw it from a regional president.

Voting for the Parliament was on the basis of universal suffrage, which comprised all nationals over 18 years of age, registered in the Canary Islands and in full enjoyment of their political rights. Amendments to the electoral law in 2011 required for Canarians abroad to apply for voting before being permitted to vote, a system known as "begged" or expat vote. The 60 members of the Parliament of the Canary Islands were elected using the D'Hondt method and a closed list proportional representation, with an electoral threshold of 30 percent of valid votes—which included blank ballots—being applied in each constituency. Alternatively, parties could also enter the seat distribution as long as they reached six percent regionally. Seats were allocated to constituencies, corresponding to the islands of El Hierro, Fuerteventura, Gran Canaria, La Gomera, La Palma, Lanzarote and Tenerife, with each being allocated a fixed number of seats.

As a result of the aforementioned allocation, each constituency was entitled the following seats for the 2015 regional election:

Election date
The term of the Parliament of the Canary Islands expired four years after the date of its previous election, with elections to the Parliament being fixed for the fourth Sunday of May every four years. The previous election was held on 27 May 2007, setting the election date for the Parliament on Sunday, 22 May 2011.

The Parliament of the Canary Islands could not be dissolved before the date of expiry of parliament except in the event of an investiture process failing to elect a regional president within a two-month period from the first ballot. In such a case, the Parliament was to be automatically dissolved and a fresh election called, with elected deputies merely serving out what remained of their four-year terms.

Parties and candidates
The electoral law allowed for parties and federations registered in the interior ministry, coalitions and groupings of electors to present lists of candidates. Parties and federations intending to form a coalition ahead of an election were required to inform the relevant Electoral Commission within ten days of the election call, whereas groupings of electors needed to secure the signature of at least one percent of the electorate in the constituencies for which they sought election, disallowing electors from signing for more than one list of candidates.

Below is a list of the main parties and electoral alliances which contested the election:

Opinion polls
The table below lists voting intention estimates in reverse chronological order, showing the most recent first and using the dates when the survey fieldwork was done, as opposed to the date of publication. Where the fieldwork dates are unknown, the date of publication is given instead. The highest percentage figure in each polling survey is displayed with its background shaded in the leading party's colour. If a tie ensues, this is applied to the figures with the highest percentages. The "Lead" column on the right shows the percentage-point difference between the parties with the highest percentages in a poll. When available, seat projections determined by the polling organisations are displayed below (or in place of) the percentages in a smaller font; 31 seats were required for an absolute majority in the Parliament of the Canary Islands.

Results

Overall

Distribution by constituency

Notes

References
Opinion poll sources

Other

Canary Islands
Regional elections in the Canary Islands
2011 in the Canary Islands
May 2011 events in Europe